Dr. Adian Husaini (born December 17, 1965) is an Islamic scholar from Indonesia. .

He served on numerous organizations, including the chairman of the Council of Da'wah Islamiyah Indonesia (Indonesian Islamic Propagation Council), the secretary general of the Indonesian Committee for the Islamic World Solidarity (KISDI), the Indonesian Committee for Solidarity Palestine - Indonesian Ulema Council (KISP-MUI), the Commission on Religious Harmony of Indonesian Ulema Council (MUI), and a member of the board of Majlis Tabligh Muhammadiyah.

Early life
He obtained his Islamic education in Madrasah Diniyah Nurul Ilmi Bojonegoro from 1971 to 1977, Pondok Pesantren Ar Rasyid Kendal Bojonegoro from 1981 to 1984, Pondok Pesantren Ulil Albab Bogor from 1988 to 1989, Arabic Language Education Institute, and LIPIA Jakarta in 1988.

His undergraduate degree in veterinary is from Bogor Agricultural University (IPB), while master's degree in international relations is obtained from Postgraduate Program of International Relations of Jayabaya University Jakarta, with a thesis entitled Pragmatism of Israeli Foreign Policy. He holds a doctorate at the Institute of Islamic Thought and Civilization-International Islamic University Malaysia (ISTAC-IIUM) in the field of Islamic thought and civilization.

Scholastic career
He worked as a researcher at the Indonesian Society for Middle East Studies (ISMES) Jakarta and the Institute for the Study of Islamic Thought & Civilizations (INSIST), and staff at Center for Middle Eastern and Islamic Studies University of Indonesia (PKTTI-UI) Jakarta.

He has also been a journalist for Jakarta Daily News Buana, Republika Jakarta Daily, and a news analyst at Radio Muslim FM Jakarta, as well as a lecturer of Journalism and Islamic thought at Ibnu Khaldun University of Bogor and Pesantren Tinggi (Ma'had 'Aly) Husnayain Jakarta.

He writes many books, with most of his works being the criticism against the perceived rise of the liberal Islamic movement, especially in Indonesia. His book Pluralisme Agama: Haram (Religious Pluralism: Haram) challenged the liberal and progressive criticisms toward the 2005 fatwa by the Indonesian Ulema Council targeting religious pluralism. In his writings, he considers religious pluralism as an ideology which considers all religion to be true, thus undermining the legitimacy of Islam. His book Christian-Western Hegemony in Islamic Studies in Higher Education was voted the 2nd best book of the Islamic Book Fair of 2007. At the same forum a year earlier, his book entitled The Face of Western Civilization: From Christian Hegemony to Secular-Liberal Dominance became the best non-fiction book.

References

1965 births
20th-century Muslim scholars of Islam
Indonesian Muslims
Indonesian Islamists
Living people
Sunni Muslim scholars of Islam
Bogor Agricultural University alumni
People from Bojonegoro Regency